A Regular Woman is a 2019 German biographical film directed by Sherry Hormann. It is based on the life of Hatun "Aynur" Sürücü who was killed by her brother in an honor killing.

Hormann stated that by 2019 people were "increasingly fencing ourselves in", so she decided to make the film.

The film is narrated by an actress playing Sürücü. The characters, in the initial scene, speak Turkish until one breaks the fourth wall and acknowledges that the viewers cannot comprehend their speech, before the characters switch to German, the primary medium of the film. The film includes some video footage of the real Sürücü with her boyfriend.

Reception
Alissa Simon of Variety wrote that it "owes much to its fine cast and impeccable technical package."

Keith Ulrich of The Hollywood Reporter wrote that the actors were "excellent" and that it was "meticulous dramatic reenactment designed specifically to give a victim back their voice — quite the honorable intention." Ulrich criticised how the film highlights "the fact that Aynur's murder is a foregone conclusion" and the final death scene. The film received the Cinema for Peace Award for justice in 2020.

References

External links 

2019 biographical drama films
2019 films
2010s German films
2010s German-language films
Films about honor killing
Films directed by Sherry Hormann
German biographical drama films